Hesiolicium is a genus of worms belonging to the family Paratomellidae.

Species:
 Hesiolicium inops Crezee & Tyler, 1976

References

Acoelomorphs